Gridlock was an Irish television game show, hosted by Derek Mooney, that premiered on RTÉ on September 14, 1998. Gridlock replaced the long-running series Blackboard Jungle, which was hosted by Ray D'Arcy.

The show lasted only one season. There were three teams of two people, each team representing a secondary school. One player on each team would answer general knowledge questions, while the other would try to achieve "gridlock" on a puzzle diagram.

References

1998 Irish television series debuts
Irish game shows